The Archdiocese of Puerto Montt (in Latin: Archidioecesis Portus Montt) is a Metropolitan See of the Roman Catholic church, in Chile.  Its suffragan dioceses are: Osorno, San Carlos de Ancud and Punta Arenas.

History
The diocese of Puerto Montt was created with  territory carved out of the diocese of San Carlos de Ancud, on 11 April 1939, by Pope Pius XII and elevated to Archdiocese and Metropolitan on May 10, 1963. The "Virgen del Carmen" is the patroness saint of the archdiocese.

Diocesan statistics
The archdiocese, which comprises the entire province of Llanquihue in the Los Lagos region of Chile, covers a territory of 18,205 km² and has 31 parishes. The estimated catholic population of the diocese is about 235,000 out of a total population of 330,000. 
The diocesan cathedral, located in the city of Puerto Montt, was built in 1870 in the doric style and is dedicated to the "Virgen del Carmen".

Ordinaries of Puerto Montt
Bishops
Ramón Munita Eyzaguirre (29 April 1939 – 23 November 1957 appointed bishop of San Felipe)
Alberto Rencoret Donoso (21 March 1958, appointed as archbishop May 10, 1963 – 18 May 1970, resigned)
Archbishops
Eladio Vicuña Aránguiz, translated from Chillán (16 July 1974 – 13 May 1987 retired)
Savino Bernardo Maria Cazzaro Bertollo, O.S.M. translated from the Apostolic Vicariate of Aysén (8 February 1988 – 27 February 2001, retired)
Cristián Caro Cordero, former auxiliary bishop of Santiago (27 February 2001 – 11 June 2018)

Auxiliary bishop
Jorge Maria Hourton Poisson (1969-1974), appointed Auxiliary Bishop of Santiago de Chile

Parishes and Sanctuaries
Parishes:

Matriz Nuestra Señora del Carmen, (Cathedral) Puerto Montt
San Pedro, Puerto Montt (Angelmó)
Cristo Rey, Puerto Montt
San Antonio de Padua, Puerto Montt (Bellavista)
Cristo Crucificado, Puerto Montt
María Madre y Reina, Puerto Montt
San Pablo, Puerto Montt
Buen Pastor, Puerto Montt
Nuestra Señora de Fátima, Puerto Montt
San Miguel Arcángel, Calbuco-Puluqui
María Inmaculada, Cochamó
Santo Toribio, Las Quemas
San Pedro, Los Muermos
San José, Llanquihue
Espíritu Santo, Fresia
Inmaculada Concepción, Frutillar
Nuestra Señora del Rosario, Maullín
Santa Rosa, Nueva Braunau
Nuestra Señora de Fátima, Puerto Chico
Sagrado Corazón de Jesús, Puerto Varas
Inmaculada Concepción, Río Frío
San Pedro, Rolecha
San Andrés, Tegualda

Sanctuaries:

Sanctuary (Gruta) "Nuestra Señora de Lourdes", Puerto Montt

References

External links
Archdiocese of Puerto Montt at the Catholic-hierarchy website

Puerto Montt
 
Puerto Montt
Puerto Montt
Puerto Montt
1939 establishments in Chile